Eurhodia is a genus of echinoderms belonging to the family Cassidulidae.

The species of this genus are found in Europe and Northern America.

Species:

Eurhodia baumi 
Eurhodia corralesi 
Eurhodia elbana 
Eurhodia falconensis 
Eurhodia freneixae 
Eurhodia holmesi 
Eurhodia morrisi 
Eurhodia relicta 
Eurhodia rugosa
Eurhodia trojana

References

Cassidulidae
Echinoidea genera